Paul Alexander Baran (25 August 1909 – 26 March 1964) was an American Marxist economist. In 1951 Baran was promoted to full professor at Stanford University and Baran was the only tenured Marxian economist in the United States until his death in 1964. Baran wrote The Political Economy of Growth in 1957 and co-authored Monopoly Capital with Paul Sweezy.

Life and work
Baran was born in Imperial Russia. His father, a Menshevik, left Russia for Vilnius, Lithuania in 1917. From Vilna the Baran family moved to Berlin, and then, in 1925 back to Moscow, but Paul stayed in Germany to finish his secondary school. In 1926 he attended the Plekhanov Institute in Moscow. He left again for Germany in 1928 accepting an appointment as an assistant on agricultural research with his advisor, Dr. Friedrich Pollock. Baran remained in Germany associated with the Frankfurt School Institute for Social Research. He received the Diplom-Volkswirt (graduate degree in political economy, equivalent to a master's degree) in 1931 from the Schlesische Friedrich-Wilhelm University of Breslau. He next wrote a dissertation under Emil Lederer on economic planning, and received his PhD from the University of Berlin in 1933. During these years in Germany, he met Rudolf Hilferding, author of Finance Capital and wrote under the pen name of Alexander Gabriel for the German Social Democratic Party journal Die Gesellschaft.

After the Nazi regime took power, Baran fled to Paris and then back to the USSR, and then to Vilnius, Lithuania. With the Molotov–Ribbentrop Pact and just before the Nazi invasion of Poland he emigrated to the US, where he enrolled at Harvard and received a master's degree. Short of funds, he left the PhD program and worked for the Brookings Institution and then for the Office of Price Administration and then the Office of Strategic Services. He worked under John Kenneth Galbraith at the Strategic Bombing Survey traveling to post-war Germany and Japan. Baran then worked for the United States Department of Commerce and lectured at George Washington University. He then worked for the Federal Reserve Bank of New York before resigning to join academia.

He married Elena Djatschenko, had a son Nicholas but soon divorced. Baran had his academic career in the United States, teaching at Stanford University from 1949. From 1949, he was an active participant in the formulation of editorial ideas and opinions in Monthly Review magazine edited by Paul Sweezy and Leo Huberman. Baran visited Cuba in 1960 along with Sweezy and Huberman, and was greatly inspired. In 1962 he revisited Moscow, Iran, and Yugoslavia. In his last years he worked on Monopoly Capital with Sweezy. He died from a heart attack in 1964 before it was completed by Sweezy. He is associated with the Neo-Marxian economics.

Baran introduced the concept of "economic surplus" to deal with novel complexities raised by the dominance of monopoly capital.  With Paul Sweezy, Baran elaborated the importance of this innovation, its consistency with Marx's labor concept of value, and supplementary relation to Marx's category of surplus value. Monthly Review has recently published a book of correspondence between Sweezy and Baran, which illuminates the development of their ideas on political economy, and in particular, their collaboration in writing their seminal work, Monopoly Capital. See The Age of Monopoly Capital, The Selected Correspondence of Paul A. Baran and Paul M. Sweezy, 1949–1964, edited by Nicholas Baran and John Bellamy Foster, Monthly Review Press, New York, 2017.

According to Baran's categories, "Actual economic surplus" is "the difference between society's actual current output and its actual current consumption," and hence is equal to current savings or accumulation. Potential economic surplus," in contrast, is "the difference between that output that could be produced in a given natural and technical environment with the help of employable productive resources, and what might be regarded as essential consumption." Baran also introduced the concept of "planned surplus"—a category that could only be operationalized in a rationally planned socialist society. This was defined as "the difference between society's 'optimum' output available in a historically given natural and technological environment under conditions of planned 'optimal' utilization of all available productive resources, and some chosen 'optimal' volume of consumption."

Baran used the surplus concept to analyze underdeveloped economies in his The Political Economy of Growth. Baran with Paul M. Sweezy applied the surplus concept to the contemporary US economy in Monopoly Capital.

Notable among Baran's students was Richard D. Wolff.

Selected bibliography 
 Baran, Paul A. (1952), The Political Economy of Underdevelopment, "Manchester School"
 Baran, Paul A. (1957), The Political Economy of Growth , Monthly Review Press, New York. Review extract.
  .
 Baran, Paul A. (1960), Marxism and Psychoanalysis [pamphlet] Monthly Review Press
 Baran, Paul A. (1961), The Commitment of the Intellectual, [pamphlet] Monthly Review Press
 Baran, Paul A. (1961), Reflections on the Cuban Revolution, [pamphlet] Monthly Review Press
 Baran, Paul A.; Sweezy, Paul (1966), Monopoly Capital: An essay on the American economic and social order, Monthly Review Press, New York
 Baran, Paul A. (1970), The Longer View: Essays toward a critique of political economy
 Baran, Paul A. (1975), The Political Economy of Neo-Colonialism

References

Further reading 
 Bellod Redondo, J. F. (2008); "Monopolio e Irracionalidad: Microfundamentos de la Teoría Baran – Sweezy"; revista Principios – Estudios de Economía Política, pp. 65–84, nº 10, Fundación Sistema, Madrid.
 Peter Clecak, Radical Paradoxes: Dilemmas of the American Left, 1945-1970 (New York: Harper & Row, 1973), pp. 72–127
 Paul Sweezy and Leo Huberman, eds, (1965); Paul A. Baran (1910–1964): A Collective Portrait, Monthly Review Press, New York.
 The Age of Monopoly Capital, The Selected Correspondence of Paul A. Baran and Paul M. Sweezy, 1949-1964, edited by Nicholas Baran and John Bellamy Foster, Monthly Review Press, New York, 2017 https://monthlyreview.org/product/age_of_monopoly_capital/

External links

 Paul A. Baran Archive at Stanford University
 Economic Development
 The Commitment of the Intellectual, Paul Baran, Monthly Review, May 1961
 

1909 births
1964 deaths
Ukrainian Jews
American people of Ukrainian-Jewish descent
Soviet emigrants to the United States
Harvard University alumni
American Marxists
American development economists
Marxian economists
Marxist theorists
20th-century American economists
Jewish socialists
Imperialism studies